Lissoclinum fragile is a species. This species was named by Willard G. Van Name in 1902. 

This species is a colonial ascidian. This means that they are marine organisms that are able to engage in a variety of pharmacological activities. This includes antimicrobial, hemolytic, and cytotoxic properties and activities.

References

Taxa named by Willard G. Van Name
Aplousobranchia